Macharaviaya is a municipality in the province of Málaga in the mountains of the autonomous community of Andalusia in the south of Spain. It is located in the comarca of La Axarquía.

The village was built upon the ruins of an old Moorish settlement. Its name is derived from Andalusian Arabic Machxar Abu Yahya, meaning "Abu Yahya's Court". It was  the home of the noble  Gálvez  family, whose descendant Matías de Gálvez y Gallardo had been the viceroy of New Spain. His son Bernardo, who was born in the village, became Governor of Louisiana and captured Baton Rouge, Mobile and Pensacola from the British during the American Revolution. The historical centre of the village has a preservation order on it. Some Spanish and foreign artists, ceramicists, painters and writers live among the villagers.

Every year in August, Macharaviaya hosts a festival honoring the patron saint of the village, Bernard of Clairvaux.

Main sights
 Church of San Jacinto 
 Templete de los Gálvez 
 Iglesia mudejar, a local church in Benaque, its tower is the minaret of a former mosque
 Museo de Gálvez

Gallery

Twin towns
 Pensacola, United States
 Galveston, United States

References

Municipalities in the Province of Málaga